The Washington State Supreme Court justices are elected at large by the voters of the state of Washington on November 6, 2012.

Supreme Court Position 2

Supreme Court Position 8

Supreme Court Position 9

References

2012 Washington (state) elections
2012